Sikkil C. Gurucharan (born 21 June 1982) is among the foremost young performing musicians of Carnatic music in India today. He is the grandson of Sikkil Kunjumani, elder of the internationally acclaimed flautists the Sikkil Sisters. Gurucharan has been under the tutelage Vaigal Shri S. Gnanaskandan and is currently being mentored by Shri B. Krishnamurthy. He is an 'A' grade All India Radio artist. The magazine India Today featured him among 35 Game Changers Under (the age of) 35 in India, a list of young achievers from different walks of life.

In 2020, he acted in a tamil anthology film, Putham Pudhu Kaalai.

Early life 
Around 1987, as a 5-year-old, Gurucharan was casually coaxed by his grandmothers, the Sikkil Sisters, to sing some tune. After a little cajoling, he sang a popular film song. The sisters, especially Smt. Neela, were amazed at the "sruthi sudhham" or tonal perfection in his singing and also the near-perfect alignment of the notes. Together they decided that he must pursue vocal music. Almost every second member in the family had been trained in flute. But they were insistent that this boy should pursue singing, especially since he had shown immense promise at that age.

This was how Gurucharan made his initial forays into Carnatic music. Soon after the initiation, his family had to shift base to Hyderabad. At this juncture, his mother Mythili Chandrasekaran decided to impart the bala padam (initial exercises) and popular songs like Mudhaakaratha modhakam, Madhuraashtakam and Kurai ondrum illai among others. He began to involuntarily register the lessons that his sister learnt to play on the flute as well.

In 1990, the family returned to Chennai and the Sikkil Sisters wasted no time in ensuring that Gurucharan began serious music training under the aegis of Vaigai Shri S. Gnanaskandan, disciple of Dandapani Desikar and Semmangudi Srinivasa Iyer. Guru Gnanaskandan was then the producer of All India Radio. Being a strict disciplinarian, Gnanaskandan ensured that Gurucharan took music seriously, especially when the people at home had created an ambience filled with Carnatic music to build his interest in singing.

Education and initial career 
Sikkil Gurucharan was a student of Vidya Mandir Senior Secondary School, Mylapore, Chennai.

Gurucharan graduated from Vidya Mandir as the Best Outgoing Student in recognition of his achievements as an all-rounder. Following this, he enrolled himself at the prestigious Ramakrishna Mission Vivekananda College which became integral to him pursuing music as a career due to the encouragement he received from all sides.

On the music front, he was by then more in tune with concert-related techniques and had begun singing during the Madras Music Season. His college professors were knowledgeable in Carnatic music and were very supportive of his development. In 2002, Gurucharan graduated with a gold medal for excellence in academics and was awarded the Best Outgoing Student once again.

By this time, Gurucharan had realised that his destiny was to pursue music. Regular outstation concerts and other assignments forced him to further his education through correspondence. He completed his master's degree in Financial Management from Loyola College, Chennai in 2004.

After completing post-graduation, Sikkil Gurucharan did a brief stint as a radio jockey at Worldspace Radio. In this profile, he was in-charge of presenting programmes, interviewing artists and doing voice-overs for the 24-hour Carnatic music channel "Shruti". Later when the channel shifted base from Chennai to Bangalore, Gurucharan decided to stay in Chennai, the seat of Carnatic music, and pursue his passion.

Music as a profession 

Sikkil Gurucharan's first concert was held at the Music Academy, under the aegis of the Gnanaskandan Trust in the year 1994. From the time he decided to devote himself to Carnatic music as a full-time professional, there has been no looking back. In a span of close to 13 years, Gurucharan has performed extensively in India and abroad, spanning prestigious venues such as the Music Academy (Chennai), Sri Shanmukhananda Sabha (Mumbai), Esplanade - Theatres on the Bay (Singapore), Riverside Theatres (Sydney), Korean Arts Management Centre (Seoul), the Sangeet Natak Akademi (New Delhi), Chowdiah Memorial Hall (Bangalore) and also at popular festivals like the Tyagaraja Aradhana (Tiruvaiyaru), Cleveland Thyagaraja Festival (USA), Rabindra Utsav (Kolkata), to name a few.

Apart from performing the traditional Carnatic music concerts conforming to the Paddathi style, Sikkil Gurucharan and pianist Anil Srinivasan, have brought together the classical piano and Carnatic vocal music to create a format which has been termed as "devastatingly beautiful" by the legendary guitarist, John McLaughlin. Their music which has gathered followers in India, Singapore, Australia, USA and Europe in a short span of time, presents and preserves classical music in a way that reaches out to the younger listeners of music but at the same time, satisfies the puritans who look out for the aesthetic value. They have several albums to their credit. The duo has performed with renowned artists like the Dhananjayans, Anita Ratnam, Anandavalli, Ramli Ibrahim and Muraad Ali among others.

Awards & recognition 

He has also won several prizes in the competitions held at Music Academy, Narada Gana Sabha, Mylapore Fine Arts etc. during the years 1995–1999

Albums & discography 
Sikkil Gurucharan is among young musicians who stand as youth ambassadors for the future of Carnatic Music. In bringing this art to students and aficionados alike, he has opened the gates to a larger and interested audience having a welcoming attitude towards innovation while retaining the spirit of the original art form. This is evident in his active participation in youth festivals, lec-dems and his concerted effort at recording theme-based albums that have greater appeal with listeners.

Gurucharan has worked on an album with John McLaughlin, Mandolin U. Srinivas, Louis Banks called "Miles from India" which was nominated for the Best Contemporary Jazz Album at the 51st Grammy Awards.

His album "Ramayana" is a musical dramatisation of the epic, drawing on ragas and kritis to portray the various episodes. This album has been the underlying theme in Gurucharan's concerts in Singapore and Indonesia and received critical acclaim. On the other hand, his album "Madhirakshi", together with Anil Srinivasan, is the first of many a contemporary experiment with piano and voice. The album "Parama", has recently received a nomination for the category 'Best Carnatic Classical Album – Vocal' at the Global Indian Music Awards 2011.

Here is a comprehensive list of his albums.

Personal life 
Sikkil Gurucharan's mother Mythili, the daughter of Sikkil Kunjumani, is a retired flute teacher from the Government Music College, Chennai. His father Chandrasekaran, a consultant with a leading pharmaceutical distribution firm, is a popular Tamil theatre artist who has also done cameo roles in films like Sivaji. Gurucharan married Janani Lakshminarayan on 23 May 2010 and the couple resides in Chennai. They have a daughter, Hridya and son, Aadyant. His maternal aunt Sikkil Mala Chandrasekar is an acclaimed flautist and is married to Chandrasekar, grandson of the legendary singer M. S. Subbulakshmi.

References 

 http://www.thehindu.com/arts/music/article970355.ece
 http://timesofindia.indiatimes.com/Potpourri/Singer_from_a_family_of_flautists/articleshow/3874464.cms
 
 
 
 https://web.archive.org/web/20121004164021/http://chennaionline.com/video/interviews/Interview-with-Sikkil-Gurucharan-Vocalist/741.col

External links 
 Sikkil Gurucharan – Official Website

Male Carnatic singers
Carnatic singers
Singers from Chennai
1982 births
21st-century Indian male classical singers
Living people